Craggy Island is a narrow island marked by crags, lying in Hero Bay, Livingston Island in the South Shetland Islands, Antarctica and forming the northeast side of Blythe Bay. The area was frequented by early nineteenth century English and American sealers operating from Blythe Bay.

The feature was charted and named descriptively by the Discovery Investigations in 1935.

Location

See also 
 Composite Antarctic Gazetteer
 List of Antarctic islands south of 60° S
 SCAR
 Territorial claims in Antarctica

Map
 L.L. Ivanov et al. Antarctica: Livingston Island and Greenwich Island, South Shetland Islands. Scale 1:100000 topographic map. Sofia: Antarctic Place-names Commission of Bulgaria, 2005.

References

External links
 SCAR Composite Antarctic Gazetteer.

Islands of Livingston Island